The KBS Symphony Orchestra (KBS 교향악단) is a symphony orchestra based in South Korea. The orchestra principally performs in the KBS Hall and the concert hall of the Seoul Arts Center.

History
The orchestra was founded in 1956 as the radio orchestra of the Korean Broadcasting System (KBS).  Between 1969 and 1981, it became a state-run organization, changing its name to the National Symphony Orchestra of Korea. In this period, they performed chiefly in the National Theater of Korea. In 1979, they made their first tour overseas, in the USA.

From 1981, the orchestra's designation was restored to its former name, and new positions, such as general manager, principal guest conductor and full-time conductor, were established in the organization. Their subsequent overseas tours were in Southeast Asia (1984) and Japan (1985 and 1991). In October 1995, they performed in the UN General Assembly in New York City.

In 2000 and 2002, the orchestra performed with the State Symphony Orchestra of the Democratic People's Republic of Korea in Seoul and Pyongyang. The orchestra also held "goodwill exchange concerts" with the NHK Symphony Orchestra and the China National Symphony Orchestra in 2002.

Yoel Levi was music director of the orchestra from 2014 to 2019. In May 2021, the orchestra announced the appointment of Pietari Inkinen as its next chief conductor and music director, effective January 2022, with an initial contract through the end of 2024.

Titled conductors
Chief conductors
 Im Won-sik (1956–1971)
 Yeon-Taek Hong (1971–1981)
 Gyeong-Su Won (1986–1988)
 Othmar Mága (1992–1996)
 Myung-Whun Chung (1998)
 Dmitri Kitayenko (1999–2004)
 Shinik Hahm (2010–2012)
 Yoel Levi (2014–2019)
 Pietari Inkinen (2022 – present)

Principal guest conductors
 Walter Gilesen (1982–1984)
 Moshe Atzmon (1990–1992)
 Vakhtang Jordania (1990–1996)
 Eun-Seong Park (2000–2002)
 Seung Gwak (2004–2006, 2013–)

Full-time conductor
Nan-Sae Geum (1981–1992)

Conductor Emeritus
 Im Won-sik (1998–2002)

Recordings
In 1995, the KBS Symphony Orchestra recorded Alan Hovhaness' Symphonies Nos. 39 and 46 with guitarist Michael Long and conductor Vakhtang Jordania with KOCH International Classics.  The orchestra has also made numerous recordings with recording companies like Seoul Records and KBS.

References

External links
 Official KBS Symphony Orchestra English-language website
 KBS Symphony Orchestra English-language history pagee

Korean Broadcasting System
Musical groups established in 1956
South Korean orchestras
Radio and television orchestras
1956 establishments in South Korea
Music in Seoul